Erika Renee Land (born August 9, 1983) is an American 21st-century war poet, 2021 MacDowell Fellow, author, spoken word performer and motivational speaker. She performs music under the stage name Lyrical Lunatic. She has published two poetry collections that chronicle her experiences as a pharmacy technician while helping the Global War on Terrorism efforts, several lesbian fiction novels, and academic articles.

Early life 
Land was born in Norfolk, Virginia, on August 9, 1983. She grew up on the corner of Tidewater Drive and Wall Street in the Barraud Park neighborhood. She attended 6–7 elementary schools in multiple states because of her stepfather's military service, then Azalea Middle School and Granby High School, both located in Norfolk.

Army 

After graduating high school, Land joined the United States Army, where she earned a Pharmacy Technician technical degree – MOS classification 68Q. She was stationed at Fort Leonard Wood for basic training, Fort Sam Houston for Advanced Individual Training (AIT), and Fort Lewis, before being deployed with the 47th Combat Support Hospital to FOB Diamondback in Mosul, Iraq, and finally Walter Reed Army Medical Center. Her decorations include two Army Achievement medals, the Army Superior Unit award, the National Defense Service medal, the Global War on Terrorism service medal, the Iraq Campaign medal with campaign star, the Army Service Ribbon and the Overseas service ribbon.

Post-Army 

After returning from Mosul, Iraq in 2006, Land was diagnosed with post-traumatic stress disorder (PTSD). In February 2009, she was honorably discharged from the Army and moved to Athens, Georgia to pursue a career in pharmacy. Land lost her passion for pharmacy as she searched for ways to heal her PTSD.

Poetry 

Land attempted suicide multiple times, but was saved by what she describes as a "divine intervention". After her last attempt, she embarked on a quest to educate the general public about PTSD by way of poetry. She stumbled upon poetry after she hearing a song that reduced her to tears, prompting her to write her first poem, "War Song". After publishing it and a few others, she pursued a degree in English from the University of Georgia. Her first poetry performance was at the Globe, a local pub in Athens, for Word of Mouth. She self-published her first collection, Residual Affects, with fellow veteran and photographer Katisha Smittick in 2013. With hopes of winning the 2016 Pulitzer Prize for poetry, Land republished a few of her war-related poems along with new pieces as the solo project Georgia's Dam

Television

Music

Writings

Poetry 

Residual Affects (November 2013), co-authored with photographer KaTisha Smittick
Georgia's DAM (October 2015)

Commentary 
of an Artist (April 2018)

Fiction

It's Complicated series 

Misconceptions, (October 2012)
Scorned (November 2017)

Articles 
Out in San Antonio Magazine

 "The Real Power Couples"
 "Mujer Power"
 "Huddle Up with the San Antonio Regulators"

Stop the Debate for the now defunct Yahoo Voices.

 "Marijuana WILL BE legalized soon!" (April 13, 2014)
 "We are all Welfare beneficiaries!" (May 2, 2014)
 "We are all prejudiced!" (May 24, 2014)

Additional information 
She is a member of Sigma Gamma Rho sorority, Lambda Delta chapter.

References

External links 
 MacDowell Fellowship
 
 
 
 Mathis, Don. "Veteran Erika Land explores repercussions of war in local performance of ‘PTSD and Me’" OUTinSa. Retrieved November 5, 2015
 Texas Public Radio, Worth Repeating
Interview by Shine Out Loud
Borne the Battle
Instagram

African-American novelists
American women novelists
21st-century American novelists
American women dramatists and playwrights
American women screenwriters
University of Georgia alumni
American chick lit writers
1983 births
Living people
21st-century American poets
American women poets
American erotica writers
Women erotica writers
21st-century American women writers
21st-century American short story writers
21st-century American screenwriters
African-American screenwriters
African-American poets
21st-century African-American women writers
21st-century African-American writers
20th-century African-American people
20th-century African-American women